The Pine Club is a steakhouse in Dayton, Ohio. Founded in 1947, it has received numerous awards and accolades through the years and garnered national attention from food writers and critics.

History
The Pine Club was founded in 1947 and has had three owners:

 Jim Sullivan, 1947–1954
 Lloyd Meinzer, 1954–1979
 Dave Hulme, 1979–present

Business model
The Pine Club doesn't serve dessert and accepts no credit cards or reservations. When Secret Service agents asked for a table for George and Barbara Bush, they were told the wait was 45 minutes.

Menu
The menu of "classic steak house food" is "virtually unchanged from the day it opened."

In 2019 owner David Hulme, commenting on the unchanged menu, said, "there are no sauces or preparations that need to be done." and that "onion rings go on every steak dinner for 72 years."

Reception

National
In 2019 The Pine Club was featured on Cooking Channel's The Best Thing I Ever Ate as chef and restaurateur Jonathon Sawyer's choice. Sawyer said, "Complementing this perfect piece of meat is 75 years of history and wood and lighting and service and martini. It's the whole experience that's the best thing I ever ate."

In 2015, Food Network named it the #2 steakhouse in the country, calling it "an unmatched blend of high-end dining and Midwest hospitality."

In 2013, The New York Times' Style Magazine, T Magazine, named it one of "10 of the World's Greatest Old Dining Institutions." In 2012, Michael Stern named it his favorite steakhouse in the country. Jane and Michael Stern wrote in 500 Things to Eat Before It's Too Late and the Very Best Places to Eat Them that the Pine Club's hamburger "may be the biggest flavored hamburger anywhere." In 2006, Gourmet named them one of ten restaurants serving the best fried potatoes in the country.

Local
The Pine Club won three categories in Dayton.com's Best of 2018 awards: Best Classic Restaurant, Best Fine Dining and Best Steak. The Dayton Daily News called it "iconic".

References

External links

 

1947 establishments in Ohio
Companies based in Dayton, Ohio
Culture of Dayton, Ohio
Restaurants established in 1947
Restaurants in Ohio
Steakhouses in the United States